Gerard Johannes Nicolaus de Korte (born 13 June 1955) is a Dutch Roman Catholic clergyman and Bishop of 's-Hertogenbosch. He was bishop of the diocese of Groningen-Leeuwarden from 2008 to 2016. Before that he was auxiliary bishop of the Archdiocese of Utrecht and dean of the deanery IJsellanden. His motto is Confidens in Christo (Trust in Christ).

Early life and education 
Gerard Johannes Nicolaus de Korte was born on 13 June 1955 in Vianen in the Netherlands. He was the youngest of three children.

De Korte graduated in 1974 from the Alberdingk Thijmcollege in Hilversum. He studied history at the Rijksuniversiteit Utrecht from 1974 to 1980. During this time De Korte got more interested in religion and the Church. While writing his final thesis he received certificates in Greek and Latin. He graduated in 1980. Soon after that he became a student at the Katholieke Theologische Universiteit in Utrecht. After graduation, he decided to study theology. He graduated from his theology studies in 1987. In 1994 he was promoted to doctor of theology on a thesis titled Priesthood of reconciliation. Possibilities and borders of the theology of the word, especially that of Eduard Thurneysen, for Catholic pastoral care.

Church career
Following his priestly ordination in 1987 he became a member of the staff of the Ariënskovikt seminary. he was also appointed as parish priest of the Cathedral of St. Catharina in Utrecht. From 1992 to 1999 he was rector of the Ariënskonvikt. In 1999 he was appointed to dean of Salland, which was merged with the deanery of Veluwe-Flevoland to form the deanery of IJsellanden. As such he was also a member of the bishop's council.

Pope John Paul II appointed Gerard de Korte as auxiliary bishop of the Archdiocese of Utrecht on 11 April 2001 and as titular bishop of Caesarea in Mauritania.  Cardinal Simonis also appointed him as diocesan vicar. His primary duty was in the fields of catechesis and liturgy. Within the conference of bishops he was responsible for Church and Society.

On 18 June 2008, Pope Benedict XVI appointed him bishop of the diocese of Groningen-Leeuwarden, succeeding Msgr. Eijk who had been made Archbishop of Utrecht earlier that year. De Korte was enthroned on 13 September 2008.

In March 2016 was announced that De Korte will succeed Bishop Hurkmans as bishop of the Diocese of 's-Hertogenbosch, the most populous diocese in the Netherlands.

Ordinations

Deacon - 10 January 1987 by Cardinal Simonis in the Cathedral of Saint Catherine in Utrecht.
Priest - 5 September 1987 by Cardinal Simonis in the church of Saint Aloysius in Utrecht.
Bishop - 2 June 2001 by Cardinal Simonis, Cardinal Willebrands and Bishop  in St Catherine's Cathedral, Utrecht.

References

External links
 

1955 births
21st-century Roman Catholic bishops in the Netherlands
20th-century Dutch Roman Catholic theologians
Living people
People from Groningen (city)
People from Vianen
Roman Catholic bishops of Groningen-Leeuwarden
Utrecht University alumni
21st-century Dutch Roman Catholic theologians